Cossus tibetanus is a moth in the family Cossidae. It was described by Hua, Chou, Fang and Chen in 1990. It is found in China (Tibet).

References

Natural History Museum Lepidoptera generic names catalog

Cossus
Moths described in 1990
Moths of Asia